Team Lot-et-Garonne was a French professional cycling team, which competed in elite road bicycle racing events such as the UCI Women's Road World Cup.

References

Cycling teams based in France
UCI Women's Teams
Cycling teams established in 2008